Haroon Siddiqui,  is an Indo-Canadian newspaper journalist, columnist and a former editor.

Early life and career

Siddiqui continued as a columnist at the Star until 2015. His farewell column of 1 April 2015 marked his retirement from journalism.

Awards and distinctions
He shared a 1983 National Newspaper Award for spot news reporting. In 1992 and column writing in 1998. Siddiqui received a Professional Man of the Year award from Indo Canadian Chamber of Commerce, and a media award from the Canadian Islamic Congress.

In 2000, and 2001 he became a member of the Order of Ontario, for crafting "a broader definition of the Canadian identity," inclusive of our First Nations, French Canadians and newer Canadians.

In 2001, Siddiqui was awarded an honorary Doctor of Letters from York University.  In 2002, he was awarded the World Press Freedom Award by the National Press Club in Ottawa for his James Minifie Memorial Lecture at the University of Regina, warning against "creeping censorship" in Canada under media concentration.

Criticisms
Writing in Toronto Life in June 2001, Robert Fulford maintained that "Siddiqui makes the most strenuous effort to bathe Third World countries in a soft light. No matter how outrageous its actions, a non-Western government can usually count on him for a little understanding."

In a June 2013 column, Siddiqui demanded that Canada's Minister of Citizenship and Immigration Jason Kenney "should resign or be fired." In an article the following month, Siddiqui accused Kenney, of "turn[ing] immigration into a tool of anti-Arab and anti-Muslim bigotry," and of "barring refugee claimants from ‘safe third countries.’" Chris Selley, writing in the National Post, pointed out that immigration levels of individuals speaking Arabic as a first language have actually increased during Kenney's tenure. Regarding Siddiqui's second claim, Shelley argued that refugees from "safe third countries" are not automatically refused refugee status by Canada but rather are "directed them into an expedited system with a somewhat weaker appeals process." Selley also argued that Siddiqui's accusation against Kenney in this regard was "a massive factual error that you’d think an expert on this matter wouldn’t make."

See also
 Siddiqui

References

External links
Haroon and the Sea of Opinions (Ryerson Review of Journalism, Spring 2002)
On Journalism being subject to "hate laws"
Haroon Siddiqui, 2000 Order of Ontario recipients' page
Haroon Siddiqui, 2001 Order of Canada citation

Living people
Canadian columnists
Canadian social commentators
Indian emigrants to Canada
Indian male journalists
Writers from Hyderabad, India
Members of the Order of Ontario
Members of the Order of Canada
Canadian Sunni Muslims
Indian Muslims
Canadian people of Indian descent
Toronto Star people
Canadian political journalists
Year of birth missing (living people)